Ryeford railway station served the villages of Ryeford, Kings Stanley and Leonard Stanley in Gloucestershire, England. It was on the 9.3 km-long Stonehouse and Nailsworth Railway, later part of the Midland Railway.

The station opened with the railway in 1867. It was large for a country station and included a two-storey station-master's house. The single platform at Ryeford was unusually wide. Sidings served a large timber yard and a signalbox was sited at Ryeford when the short branch to Stroud from Dudbridge, the next station towards Nailsworth, opened in 1885.

The Stonehouse and Nailsworth Railway, along with the rest of the Midland Railway, became part of the London Midland and Scottish Railway at the 1923 Grouping. Passenger services were suspended on the line as an economy measure to save fuel in June 1947, and were officially withdrawn from 8 June 1949. Ryeford remained open for goods traffic until 1964, though the signalbox closed in 1958. The line itself closed for goods traffic in 1966. The station buildings at Ryeford have all been demolished and the line of the track is used as the A419 road.

Services

References

External links 
 Stonehouse railway stations from 1845 by Darrell Webb in Stonehouse History Group Journal Issue 2

Stroud District
Disused railway stations in Gloucestershire
Former Midland Railway stations
Railway stations in Great Britain opened in 1867
Railway stations in Great Britain closed in 1947